James Simpson Young (27 November 1921 – 1 October 1988) was an Australian rules footballer. He played for the Geelong Football Club in 1945, appearing in two games and scoring two goals.

References

 Holmesby, Russell & Main, Jim (2007). The Encyclopedia of AFL Footballers. 7th ed. Melbourne: Bas Publishing.

External links
 
 

1921 births
Geelong Football Club players
Australian rules footballers from Victoria (Australia)
1988 deaths